Dugesia afromontana is a species of dugesiid triclad found in the Amatola Mountains, Eastern Cape, South Africa.

References

Endemic fauna of South Africa
Dugesia
Animals described in 2012